Tong Yeutho (born 15 April 1946) is a Laotian politician. He is a member of the Lao People's Revolutionary Party. He is a representative of the National Assembly of Laos for Houaphanh Province (Constituency 8).

References

Members of the National Assembly of Laos
Lao People's Revolutionary Party politicians
1946 births
Living people
Members of the 8th Central Committee of the Lao People's Revolutionary Party
Members of the 9th Central Committee of the Lao People's Revolutionary Party